There are 7 cities ("republican cities") and 81 towns ("municipality towns") in Latvia. By Latvian law, towns are settlements that are centers of culture and commerce with a well-developed architectural-infrastructure and street grid, and have at least 2,000 residents; however, a settlement can be designated a town if it has fewer residents, but fulfills all other requirements. To become a city, a town must have at least 25,000 residents. Additionally, cities should have a well-developed commercial district, transport, public utilities, social infrastructure, and be a significant center of culture. However, these requirements may be disregarded if there is sufficient population.

Cities

Towns

See also
 Administrative divisions of Latvia
 Districts of Latvia
 Cultural regions of Latvia
 List of former cities of Latvia
 List of the most populated municipalities in the Nordic countries

References

External links

 Vietas.lv- Map and information of Cities and Districts 
 MillionMetersAroundLatvia.Com- Map, information and photos of Cities
 
 Searchable map

 
 
Latvia, List of cities in
Latvia
Cities